H & R Block Ltd v Sanott [1976] 1 NZLR 213 is a cited case in New Zealand regarding the legality of restraint of trade clauses under the Illegal Contracts Act 1970.

Background
Sanott was employed as a manager of H & R Block's Christchurch office. After a falling out between them, Sannott resigned and set up in competition to them.
H & R Block sought to enforce his restraint of trade clause excluding him for operating within 25 miles of their Christchurch office for the next 5 years.

Held
The court found the restraint of trade clause was unreasonable, and modified it to excluding operating within 5 miles, for 3 years. Somers J said "The provisions of s 8 were intended to overcome the annihilating effect of the common law rules about excessive restraints and to alter those rules as to severance".

See also
 Illegal Contracts Act 1970

References

High Court of New Zealand cases
New Zealand contract case law
1975 in case law
1975 in New Zealand law
H&R Block